Notícias do Dia is a Brazilian newspaper, published in tabloid format, which circulates in the state of Santa Catarina.

It publishes different editions for the cities of Florianópolis, Tijucas, Joinville, Palhoça, and Biguaçu.

References

External links
Jornal RIC TV SC

Daily newspapers published in Brazil
Portuguese-language newspapers